Kamala Shirin Lakhdhir is the Executive Secretary of the United States Department of State. She previously served as the United States Ambassador to Malaysia from 2017 to 2021.

Early life and education
Lakhdhir was born in Brooklyn, New York, daughter of Ann (née Hallan) and Noor Lakhdhir. Her father had moved from Mumbai, India to the U.S. to study at the University of California, Berkeley and then later moved to New York City. Lakhdhir grew up in New York and Westport, Connecticut. There she was a regular participant in the annual United Nations Day, inspired in part by her mother, who had earlier served as president of the NGO Committee on Disarmament, Peace and Security at the United Nations. Lakhdhir also has a brother, David Lakhdhir.

Lakhdhir attended Bedford Junior High School and graduated from Staples High School. In 1986, she earned a bachelor's degree from Harvard University.

Career 
After graduating from Harvard, Lakhdhir travelled to China, where she stayed for two years, teaching English and American history. Returning to the U.S., she then worked for the New York City budget director and pursued graduate studies in public finance at New York University.

Lakhdhir began a career in the Foreign Service in August 1991 and became recognized as a Southeast Asia expert. Her initial assignments included international service first at the U.S. Embassy in Riyadh, Saudi Arabia and then at the Embassy in Jakarta, Indonesia. She then returned to the U.S. to a post at the Secretary of State's Secretariat. Lakhdhir then accepted a year long Pearson Fellowship, working for Congressman Doug Bereuter on the staff of the House Subcommittee on Asia and the House Subcommittee on International Monetary Policy and Trade.
Lakhdhir moved to China in 2001 and served at the U.S. Embassy in Beijing until 2005. Then for two years Lakhdhir served as director of the Office of Maritime Southeast Asia, which is in the State Department's Bureau of East Asian and Pacific Affairs, an organization responsible for U.S. relations with the Philippines, Indonesia, Malaysia, Singapore, Brunei Darussalam, and Timor-Leste.  She earned a master's degree from the National War College in 2007. In 2009, Lakhdhir moved to Northern Ireland, where she served as U.S. Consul General in Belfast for two years before accepting an assignment as Executive Assistant to Under Secretary for Political Affairs.

Ambassador to Malaysia 

Lakhdhir was nominated by President Barack Obama to serve as United States Ambassador to Malaysia on 16 June 2016 and was confirmed by the U.S. Senate on 10 December 2016. She was appointed on December 19, 2016 and presented her credentials on February 21, 2017.

In her role as ambassador, Lakhdhir has been engaged in improving communications with Malaysians through a greater range of media, supporting on-going cooperation of U.S. companies in Malaysia and the nation's workforce, as well as promoting cooperative undertaking such as research on renewable energy for the country.

On May 21, 2018, Lakhdhir met with Prime Minister Tun Dr Mahathir Mohamad at his Perdana Leadership Foundation office, congratulating him on his electoral win and welcoming the opportunity to work with him and his cabinet. In August 2018, she accompanied Mike Pompeo U.S. Secretary of State as he visited Dr. Mahathir, Defence Minister Mohamad Sabu and Deputy Foreign Minister Dato' Marzuki Yahya. Pompeo became the most senior US official to visit the new prime minister since his election victory.

Lakhdir also welcomed U.S. participation in Pacific Partnership 2018, the Asia-Pacific's largest humanitarian assistance and disaster-relief preparedness mission, which ran from February through June 2018.

Executive Secretary 

Lakhdhir has served as Executive Secretary of the United States Department of State since March 1, 2021.

References

Harvard University alumni
Ambassadors of the United States to Malaysia
American people of Indian descent
Obama administration personnel
Trump administration personnel
Biden administration personnel
Living people
United States Foreign Service personnel
National War College alumni
Date of birth missing (living people)
Year of birth missing (living people)
21st-century American diplomats
American women ambassadors
People from Brooklyn
21st-century American women